Jim Gardner (3 August 1893 – 20 July 1976) was a Scottish trade unionist.

Born near Glasgow, Gardner worked in a brass foundry at the age of fourteen.  Two years later, he joined the Associated Iron Moulders of Scotland trade union, and around this time also joined the Independent Labour Party (ILP).  Gardner was highly active in the ILP during World War I, but then joined the Communist Party of Great Britain (CPGB) on its formation in 1920.

The Associated Iron Moulders eventually became part of the National Union of Foundry Workers, and Gardner was elected as its Scottish district secretary in 1941, succeeding Jock McBain.  He stood in the election to become general secretary of the Foundry Workers in 1943 and, despite the opposition of the union's executive, lost to the incumbent Albert Wilkie by only 7,044 votes to 8,024.  During World War II, he also served on the Petroleum Board.

In 1944, Wilkie died and Gardner stood again for the general secretary post, this time beating Tom Colvin in another close vote.  He led the union into a merger in 1946 which formed the Amalgamated Union of Foundry Workers, and served as general secretary of the new union until his retirement in 1958.  He was known for his focus on health and safety in foundries.  Around the 1950s, Gardner also served on the executive of the CPGB.

References

1893 births
1976 deaths
Communist Party of Great Britain members
British trade union leaders
Trade unionists from Glasgow